Bloodshot may refer to:

Music
 Bloodshot (The J. Geils Band album) (1973)
 Bloodshot (Choir album) (2018)
"Bloodshot" (song), a 2019 song by Dove Cameron
 Bloodshot Records, a record label

Other uses
 Bloodshot (comics), a Valiant comic book series
 Bloodshot (film), a 2020 film based on the comic
 Blood Shot (novel), a 1988 novel by Sara Paretsky
 Bloodshot (video game), a 1994 video game by Domark
 Condemned 2: Bloodshot, a 2008 video game

See also
 Conjunctivitis
 Red eye (medicine)